The genus Hieracium, hawkweeds, is a very large genus of flowering plants in the sunflower family (Asteraceae).

The database IPNI gives more than 12,100 named taxa, including subspecies and synonyms.

The following list consists of about 1,000 accepted species and cited synonyms.  Bold for endangered species.

A more detailed discussion is given in the article Hieracium.

 Hieracium abastumanense
Hieracium abscissum
 Hieracium abruptorum
 Hieracium acranthophorum
 Hieracium achalzichiense
 Hieracium acinacifolium
 Hieracium acranthophorum: Tunugdliarfik hawkweed
 Hieracium acrifolium
 Hieracium acrochlorum
 Hieracium acrogymnon
 Hieracium acroleucoides
 Hieracium acroleucum 
 Hieracium acroxanthum
 Hieracium acuminatifolium
 Hieracium acuminatum
 Hieracium acutangulum
 Hieracium acutisquamum
 Hieracium aczelmanicum
 Hieracium adakense
 Hieracium adelum
 Hieracium adenoactis
 Hieracium adenocladum
 Hieracium adjarianum
 Hieracium adlerzii
 Hieracium adunantidens
 Hieracium agathanthum
 Hieracium agronesaeum
 Hieracium akinfiewii
 Hieracium akjaurense
 Hieracium alatavicum
 Hieracium albellipes
 Hieracium alberti
 Hieracium albertinum : Western hawkweed
 Hieracium albidulum
 Hieracium albipes
 Hieracium albiflorum : White hawkweed
 Hieracium albocinereum
 Hieracium albocostatum
 Hieracium alismatifolium
 Hieracium alphostictum
 Hieracium alpinum
 Hieracium altaicum 
 Hieracium alticaule
 Hieracium altipes
 Hieracium amaureilema
 Hieracium amaurobasis
 Hieracium amaurochlorum
 Hieracium amblylobum
 Hieracium amitsokense
 Hieracium amnoon
 Hieracium amoenoarduum
 Hieracium amphileion
 Hieracium amphitephrodes
 Hieracium amplexicaule : Sticky hawkweed
 Hieracium anfractum
 Hieracium angmagssalikense
 Hieracium angustifrons
 Hieracium angustilobatum
 Hieracium angustisquamatum
 Hieracium antecursorum
 Hieracium antennarioidiforme
 Hieracium apatorium
 Hieracium aphanum
 Hieracium apicifolium
 Hieracium apiculatum
 Hieracium aquilonare
 Hieracium arctogenum
 Hieracium arctogeton
 Hieracium arctomurmanicum
 Hieracium arcuatidens
 Hieracium argillaceoides
 Hieracium argillaceum 
 Hieracium argutum
 Hieracium armeniacum
 Hieracium arvicola
 Hieracium arvorum
 Hieracium aryslynense
 Hieracium asiaticum
 Hieracium assimilatum
 Hieracium asterodermum
 Hieracium astibes
 Hieracium asymmetricum
 Hieracium atratum
 Hieracium atrellum
 Hieracium atricollum
 Hieracium atriplicifolium
 Hieracium atrocephalum
 Hieracium attenboroughianum
 Hieracium aupaense
 Hieracium aurantiacum : Orange hawkweed
 Hieracium auratum
 Hieracium aureiceps
 Hieracium auriculoides
 Hieracium austriacum
 Hieracium bakurianense
 Hieracium barbulatulum
 Hieracium basifureum
 Hieracium basileucum
 Hieracium bauhini 
 Hieracium bembicophorum
 Hieracium beschtaviciforme
 Hieracium beschtavicum
 Hieracium besserianum
 Hieracium bichloricolor
 Hieracium biebersteinii
 Hieracium blyttianum
 Hieracium bolanderi
 Hieracium borodinianum 
 Hieracium borshomiense
 Hieracium borzawae
 Hieracium botniense
 Hieracium botrychodes
 Hieracium brachiatum
 Hieracium branae
 Hieracium brandisianum
Hieracium brevipilum
 Hieracium brittatense
 Hieracium bupleurifolioides
 Hieracium bupleurifolium
 Hieracium buschianum
 Hieracium cacuminatum
 Hieracium caesiiflorioides
 Hieracium caesiiflorum
 Hieracium caesiogenum
 Hieracium caesiomurorum
 Hieracium caesium
 Hieracium caespitosum : Meadow hawkweed
 Hieracium calcigenum
 Hieracium callichlorum
 Hieracium callicymum
 Hieracium calodon
 Hieracium calodontopsis
 Hieracium calolepideum
 Hieracium canadense : Canada hawkweed
 Hieracium canitiosum
 Hieracium canum
 Hieracium carcarophyllum
 Hieracium cardiobasis
 Hieracium cardiophyllum
 Hieracium carneum
 Hieracium carpathicola
 Hieracium casparyanum
 Hieracium catenatum
 Hieracium caucasicum
 Hieracium caucasiense
 Hieracium cauri
 Hieracium cercidotelmatodes
 Hieracium cereolinum
 Hieracium chaetothyrsoides
 Hieracium chaetothyrsum
 Hieracium chamar-dabanense
 Hieracium chaunocymum
 Hieracium cheriense
 Hieracium chibinense
 Hieracium chibinicola
 Hieracium chlorelliceps
 Hieracium chlorellum
 Hieracium chlorochromum
 Hieracium chloroleucolepium
 Hieracium chloromaurum
 Hieracium chlorophilum
 Hieracium chlorophyllum
 Hieracium chloroprenanthes
 Hieracium christianense
 Hieracium chromolepium
 Hieracium chrysanthum
 Hieracium cimpiense 
 Hieracium cincinnatum
 Hieracium cinerellisquamum
 Hieracium cischibinense
 Hieracium cisuralense
 Hieracium ciuriwkae
 Hieracium cophanense
 Hieracium colliniforme 
 Hieracium collinum
 Hieracium coloratum
 Hieracium columbianum
 Hieracium comatuloides
 Hieracium concinnidens
 Hieracium concoloriforme
 Hieracium conflectens
 Hieracium coniciforme
 Hieracium conicum
 Hieracium consociatum
 Hieracium contractum
 Hieracium crassifoliiforme
 Hieracium creperiforme
Hieracium crepidispermum
 Hieracium cretaceum
 Hieracium crocatum
 Hieracium croceum
 Hieracium cruciatum
 Hieracium cruentiferum
 Hieracium cryptomastix
 Hieracium curvescens
 Hieracium curvulum
 Hieracium cusickii
 Hieracium cuspidelliforme
 Hieracium cuspidellum
 Hieracium cylindriceps
 Hieracium cymanthodes 
 Hieracium cymanthum 
 Hieracium cymosum
 Hieracium czadanense
 Hieracium czaiense
 Hieracium czamyjashense
 Hieracium czeremoszense
 Hieracium czeschaense
 Hieracium czunense
 Hieracium czywczynae
 Hieracium dagoense
 Hieracium deanum
 Hieracium dechyi
 Hieracium decipiens
 Hieracium decipientiforme
 Hieracium declivium
 Hieracium dedovii
 Hieracium deductum
 Hieracium demetrii
 Hieracium densiflorum
 Hieracium denticuliferum
 Hieracium derivatum
 Hieracium diaphanoides
 Hieracium dilutius
 Hieracium diremtum
 Hieracium disputabile
 Hieracium dissolutum
 Hieracium distractifolium
 Hieracium dobromilense
 Hieracium dolichanthelum
 Hieracium dolichotrichum
 Hieracium dolinense
 Hieracium donetzicum
 Hieracium dshurdshurense
 Hieracium dubium
 Hieracium dublanense
 Hieracium dublizkii
 Hieracium duderhofense
 Hieracium duerkhemicum
 Hieracium dunale
 Hieracium durum
 Hieracium echioides
 Hieracium eichvaldii
 Hieracium elaeochlorum
 Hieracium elimense
 Hieracium empodistum 
 Hieracium endaurovae
 Hieracium ensiferum
 Hieracium epichlorum
 Hieracium ericeticola
 Hieracium ericetorum
 Hieracium ermaniense
 Hieracium erraticum
 Hieracium erythrocarpoides
 Hieracium erythrocarpum
 Hieracium erythrochristum
 Hieracium erythrophylloides
 Hieracium euchaetium
 Hieracium euirriguum
 Hieracium eurofinmarkicum
 Hieracium euryanthelum
 Hieracium eusciadium
 Hieracium excubitum
 Hieracium eximiiforme
 Hieracium exotericum
 Hieracium expallidiforme
 Hieracium falcidentatum
 Hieracium fallaciforme
 Hieracium farinifloccusum
 Hieracium fariniramum
 Hieracium farinodermum
 Hieracium farreum
 Hieracium fastigiatum 
 Hieracium fendleri
 Hieracium fennoorbicantiforme
 Hieracium ferroviae
 Hieracium festinum
 Hieracium filiferum
 Hieracium filifolium
 Hieracium finmarkicum
 Hieracium firmicaule
 Hieracium flagellare
 Hieracium flettii
 Hieracium floccicomatum
 Hieracium floccinops
 Hieracium flocciparum
 Hieracium floccipedunculum
 Hieracium floribundum
 Hieracium foliolatum
 Hieracium folioliferum
 Hieracium fominianum
 Hieracium frickii
 Hieracium friesii
 Hieracium fritzei
 Hieracium fuliginosiforme
 Hieracium fulvescens
 Hieracium furfuraceoides
 Hieracium furvescens
 Hieracium fuscoatrum
 Hieracium galbanum
 Hieracium galiciense
 Hieracium ganeschinii
 Hieracium geminatiforme
 Hieracium gentile
 Hieracium georgicum
 Hieracium georgieffianum
 Hieracium gigantellum
 Hieracium glabriligulatum
 Hieracium glaucescens
 Hieracium glaucinoides
 Hieracium glaucochroum
 Hieracium glehnii
 Hieracium glomerabile
 Hieracium glomerellum
 Hieracium gmelini
 Hieracium gnaphalium
 Hieracium gorczakovskii
 Hieracium goriense
 Hieracium gorodkowianum
 Hieracium gothicifrons
 Hieracium gothicum
 Hieracium gracile
 Hieracium gracilentipes
 Hieracium granitophilum

 Hieracium granvicum
 Hieracium greenei : Greene's hawkweed
 Hieracium greenii
 Hieracium groenlandicum
 Hieracium grofae
 Hieracium gronovii : Queendevil
 Hieracium gudergomiense
 Hieracium gudissiense
 Hieracium gustavianum
 Hieracium guttenfeldense
 Hieracium gynaeconesaeum
 Hieracium haematoglossum
 Hieracium haematophilum
 Hieracium harjuense
 Hieracium heothinum
 Hieracium heterodontoides
 Hieracium hethlandiae
 Hieracium hirsuticaule
 Hieracium hirtulum
 Hieracium hispidissimum
 Hieracium hispidum
 Hieracium hohenackeri
 Hieracium holmiense
 Hieracium hololeion
 Hieracium homochroum
 Hieracium hopense
 Hieracium hoppeanum
 Hieracium horridum : Prickly hawkweed
 Hieracium hosjense
 Hieracium hryniawiense
 Hieracium hryniewieckii
 Hieracium hylocomum
 Hieracium hylogeton
 Hieracium hyparcticum
 Hieracium hypochoeroides 
 Hieracium hypoglaucum
 Hieracium hypopityforme
 Hieracium hypopitys
 Hieracium hypopogon
 Hieracium igoschinae
 Hieracium ihrowyszczense
 Hieracium imandricola
 Hieracium imponens
 Hieracium incanum
 Hieracium incomptum
 Hieracium inconveniens
 Hieracium ingricum 
 Hieracium insolens 
 Hieracium insulicola
 Hieracium integratum
 Hieracium inuloides
 Hieracium ircutense
 Hieracium iremelense
 Hieracium irriguiceps
 Hieracium iseranum
 Hieracium issatschenkoi
 Hieracium ivdelense
 Hieracium ivigtutense
 Hieracium jaccardii
 Hieracium jangajuense
 Hieracium jaworowae
 Hieracium juratzkanum
 Hieracium kabanovii
 Hieracium kaczurinii
 Hieracium kalksburgense
 Hieracium kalmii 
 Hieracium kalmutinum
 Hieracium kandalakschae
 Hieracium kaninense
 Hieracium karelicum
 Hieracium karjaginii
 Hieracium karpinskyanum
 Hieracium kemulariae
 Hieracium kiderense
 Hieracium kievejense
 Hieracium kildinense
 Hieracium kirghisorum
 Hieracium knafii
 Hieracium knappii
 Hieracium kochtanum
 Hieracium koehleri
 Hieracium kolenatii
 Hieracium kolgujevense
 Hieracium kosvinskiense
 Hieracium kozlowskyanum
 Hieracium krasanii
 Hieracium kreczetoviczii
 Hieracium krivanense
 Hieracium krylovii
 Hieracium kubanicum
 Hieracium kubenskense
 Hieracium kuekenthalianum
 Hieracium kukulense
 Hieracium kulkowianum
 Hieracium kultukense
 Hieracium kumbelicum
 Hieracium kupfferi
 Hieracium kuroksarense
 Hieracium kusnetzkiense
 Hieracium kuusamoense
 Hieracium kuzenevae
 Hieracium lackschewitzii
 Hieracium lachenalii : Common hawkweed
 Hieracium lactescens
 Hieracium lactucella Hieracium laetevirens Hieracium laevicaule Hieracium laevigatum Hieracium laevimarginatum Hieracium lailanum Hieracium lamprocomoides Hieracium lanceatum Hieracium lanceolatum Hieracium lancidens Hieracium lapponicifolium Hieracium lapponicum Hieracium largum Hieracium laschii Hieracium lasiophorum Hieracium lasiothrix Hieracium latens Hieracium laticeps Hieracium latpariense Hieracium latypeum Hieracium laurinum Hieracium lehbertii Hieracium lemmonii Hieracium lenkoranense Hieracium lepiduliforme Hieracium leptadeniiforme Hieracium leptadenium Hieracium leptocaulon Hieracium leptoclados Hieracium leptogrammoides Hieracium leptopholis Hieracium leptoprenanthes Hieracium leptothyrsum Hieracium lespinassei Hieracium leucocraspedum Hieracium leucothyrsogenes Hieracium leucothyrsoides Hieracium leucothyrsum Hieracium levieri 
 Hieracium limenyense 
 Hieracium linahamariense Hieracium lipnickianum Hieracium lippmaae Hieracium lipskyanum Hieracium lissolepium Hieracium lithuanicum Hieracium litorale Hieracium litwinowianum Hieracium livescentiforme Hieracium lividorubens Hieracium ljapinense Hieracium lobarzewskii  Rehmann
 Hieracium lomnicense Hieracium lonchophyllum Hieracium lonchopodum Hieracium longiberbe Hieracium longipilum : Hairy hawkweed
 Hieracium longipubens Hieracium longiscapum Hieracium loriense Hieracium lovozericum Hieracium lucidum : Sicilian sparviere
 Hieracium lugae-pljussae Hieracium lugdunense Hieracium lugiorum Hieracium lutnjaermense Hieracium lutulenticeps Hieracium luzuleti Hieracium lyccense Hieracium lychnaeum Hieracium lydiae Hieracium lyratum Hieracium lyrifolium Hieracium macranthelum Hieracium macrochlorellum Hieracium macrocladum Hieracium macrocymum Hieracium macroglossum Hieracium macrolepidiforme Hieracium macrolepioides Hieracium macrolepis Hieracium macrolepium Hieracium macrophyllopodum Hieracium macroradium Hieracium macrum Hieracium maculatum Hieracium magnauricula Hieracium magocsyanum Hieracium malacotrichum Hieracium manifestum Hieracium marginale Hieracium marjokense Hieracium maurocybe Hieracium medianiforme Hieracium medschedsense Hieracium megacephalum Hieracium megalomastix Hieracium melachaetum 
 Hieracium melaneilema Hieracium melanocephalum Hieracium melanophaeum Hieracium membranulatum Hieracium mestianum 
 Hieracium miansarofii Hieracium microbauhinii Hieracium microspilon Hieracium microtum Hieracium mikulinkae Hieracium mnoocladum 
 Hieracium modiciforme Hieracium mohrungenense Hieracium molle Hieracium mollisetum Hieracium monticola Hieracium monczecola Hieracium mukacevense Hieracium multifrons Hieracium multisetum Hieracium munkacsense Hieracium murmanense Hieracium murorum : Wall hawkweed
 Hieracium mutilatum Hieracium myriothrichum Hieracium nalczikense Hieracium narymense Hieracium naviense Hieracium neglectipilosum Hieracium nenukovii Hieracium neopinnatifidum Hieracium neriodowae Hieracium neroikense Hieracium nesaeum Hieracium nigrescens Hieracium nigrisetum Hieracium nigritum Hieracium nigrosilvarum Hieracium niphocladum Hieracium nivaense Hieracium niveolimbatum Hieracium nizhnetunguskaense Hieracium notenseHieracium nudicaule Hieracium obliquum Hieracium oblongum Hieracium obscuribracteatum 
 Hieracium obscuricaule Hieracium obscuriceps Hieracium obscurum Hieracium ochanskiense Hieracium oioense Hieracium oistophyllum Hieracium olympicum Hieracium onegense Hieracium orbicans Hieracium ornatum Hieracium orthobrachion Hieracium orthocladum Hieracium orthopodum Hieracium osiliae Hieracium ovaliceps Hieracium ovatifrons Hieracium pachycephalum Hieracium paczoskianum Hieracium pahnschii Hieracium paldiskiense Hieracium paludosum Hieracium panaeoliforme Hieracium paniculatum : Allegheny hawkweed
 Hieracium panjutinii Hieracium pannonicum Hieracium pannosum Hieracium paragogumHieracium parryi Hieracium parvistolonum Hieracium pasense Hieracium pellucidum Hieracium penduliforme Hieracium pendulum Hieracium perasperum Hieracium percissum Hieracium pereffusum Hieracium perileucum Hieracium perpropinquum Hieracium persimile Hieracium pervagum 
 Hieracium petrofundii Hieracium petropavlovskanum Hieracium philanthrax Hieracium pikujense Hieracium pilisquamum Hieracium pilosella : Mouse-ear hawkweed
 Hieracium piloselloides : Tall hawkweed
 Hieracium pilosissimum Hieracium pineum Hieracium plantaginifrons Hieracium pleiophyllogenes Hieracium pleiophyllopsis Hieracium pleuroleucum Hieracium plicatulum Hieracium plicatum Hieracium pluricaule Hieracium plurifoliosum Hieracium poaczense Hieracium pocuticum Hieracium podkumokense Hieracium pojoritense Hieracium poliodermum Hieracium poliudovense Hieracium polonicum Hieracium polyanthemum Hieracium polymastix 
 Hieracium polymnoon Hieracium polymorphophyllum Hieracium polytrichum Hieracium pomoricum Hieracium porphyrii Hieracium porrifolium Hieracium porrigens Hieracium praealtum Hieracium praecipuum Hieracium praecox Hieracium praemorsum Hieracium praetenerifrons Hieracium praetenerum Hieracium praetermissum Hieracium praetervisum Hieracium pratense: Yellow hawkweed
 Hieracium praticola Hieracium prenanthoides 
 Hieracium prilakenense Hieracium pringlei Hieracium proceriforme Hieracium procerigenum Hieracium procerum Hieracium prolatescens Hieracium prolixum Hieracium pruiniferum Hieracium przybyslawskii Hieracium pseudarctophilum Hieracium pseudatratum Hieracium pseudauriculoides Hieracium pseuderectum Hieracium pseudobifidum Hieracium pseudobipes Hieracium pseudoboreum Hieracium pseudocongruens Hieracium pseudofariniramum Hieracium pseudofritzei Hieracium pseudoglabridens Hieracium pseudohypochnoides Hieracium pseudoincanum Hieracium pseudojuranum Hieracium pseudokajanense Hieracium pseudolatypeum Hieracium pseudolepistoides Hieracium pseudomangii Hieracium pseudomegalomastix Hieracium pseudonigritiforme Hieracium pseudoomangii Hieracium pseudopalmenii Hieracium pseudophyllodes Hieracium pseudopikujense Hieracium pseudosparsum 
 Hieracium pseudostygium Hieracium pseudosvaneticum Hieracium pseudothaumasium Hieracium psilobrachion Hieracium purpuristictum Hieracium puschlachtae Hieracium putoranicum Hieracium pycnodon Hieracium pyrsjuense Hieracium querceticola Hieracium quinquemonticola Hieracium racemosum Hieracium raddeanum Hieracium radenium  Hieracium radiocaule Hieracium rapunculoidiforme Hieracium ratluense Hieracium ravusculum Hieracium rawaruskanum Hieracium regelianum Hieracium retroversilobatum Hieracium revocantiforme Hieracium rigidellum Hieracium rigidum Hieracium riparium Hieracium robinsonii 
 Hieracium rohacsense Hieracium rojowskii 
 Hieracium rossicum Hieracium rothianum Hieracium rotundatum Hieracium rubrobauhini Hieracium rubropannonicum Hieracium rupicoloides Hieracium rusbyi Hieracium sabaudum Hieracium sabiniceps Hieracium sabiniforme Hieracium sabinopsis Hieracium sachokianum Hieracium saevum Hieracium safonoviae Hieracium samaricum Hieracium samurense Hieracium sanctum Hieracium sangilense Hieracium sanii Hieracium sarmaticum Hieracium saussureoides Hieracium sbaense Hieracium scabiosum Hieracium scabrum : Rough hawkweed
 Hieracium scandinavicum Hieracium schelkownikowii Hieracium schellianum Hieracium schemachense Hieracium schenkii Hieracium schennikovii Hieracium schipczinskii Hieracium schischkinii Hieracium schliakovii Hieracium schmalhausenianum Hieracium schmidtii Hieracium scholanderi Hieracium schultesii Hieracium schultzii Hieracium sciadophorum Hieracium scitulum Hieracium scopulorum Hieracium scotaiolepis Hieracium scotodes Hieracium scouleri Hieracium sedutrix Hieracium segevoldense Hieracium semicymigerum Hieracium semilitoreum Hieracium semipraecox Hieracium septentrionale Hieracium sericicaule Hieracium serratifolium Hieracium sershukense Hieracium setosopetiolatum Hieracium sexangulare Hieracium shaparenkoi Hieracium signiferum Hieracium silenii Hieracium sillamaeense Hieracium silvicomum Hieracium simplicicaule Hieracium sivorkae Hieracium snowdoniense : Snowdonia hawkweed
 Hieracium sobrinatum Hieracium soczavae Hieracium sodiroanum Hieracium solonieviczii Hieracium solovetzkiense Hieracium sonchifolium Hieracium sororians Hieracium sosnowskyi Hieracium sosvaense Hieracium sparsum Hieracium spatalops Hieracium spathophyllopsis Hieracium spinodylium Hieracium spraguei Hieracium spurium Hieracium stauropolitanum Hieracium steinbergianum Hieracium stellatum Hieracium stelechodes Hieracium stenolepis Hieracium stenopiforme Hieracium stiptocaule Hieracium streptotrichum Hieracium strictum Hieracium stygium Hieracium subaquilonare Hieracium subarctophilum Hieracium subasperellum Hieracium subaurantiacum Hieracium subbakurianiense Hieracium subbauhiniflorum Hieracium subchlorophaeum Hieracium subcinerascens Hieracium subcompositum Hieracium subcrassifolium Hieracium subcymigerum Hieracium suberectum Hieracium subfariniramum Hieracium subfarinosiceps Hieracium subfiliferum Hieracium subflexicaule Hieracium subgalbanum Hieracium subglandulosipes Hieracium subgracilescens Hieracium subhirsutissimum Hieracium subimandrae Hieracium sublactucaceum Hieracium sublasiophorum Hieracium sublividum Hieracium submaculigerum Hieracium submarginellum Hieracium submedianum Hieracium submelanolepis Hieracium submirum Hieracium subnigrescens Hieracium subniviferum Hieracium subpleiophyllum Hieracium subpollichii Hieracium subramosum Hieracium subrassifolium Hieracium subrigidum Hieracium subsimplex Hieracium substoloniferum Hieracium substrictipilum Hieracium subsvaneticum Hieracium subtriangulatum Hieracium subumbelliforme Hieracium subviolascentiforme Hieracium subvirenticeps Hieracium subviriduliceps Hieracium subvulgatiforme Hieracium suchonense Hieracium sudeticum Hieracium sudetorum 
 Hieracium suecicum Hieracium sulphurelliforme Hieracium sulphurellum Hieracium suomense Hieracium svaneticiforme Hieracium svaneticiforme Hieracium sylowii Hieracium sylvularum Hieracium syreistschikovii Hieracium syrjaenorum Hieracium sysolskiense Hieracium szovitsii Hieracium tabergense Hieracium taigense Hieracium tanense Hieracium tanfiliewii Hieracium tatewakii Hieracium tatrense Hieracium tazense Hieracium teberdaefontis Hieracium teberdense Hieracium teliforme Hieracium teliumbellatum Hieracium tenacicaule Hieracium tenebricans Hieracium tephrantheloides Hieracium tephrocephalum Hieracium tephrochlorellum Hieracium tephrophilum Hieracium teplouchovii Hieracium terekianum Hieracium tericum Hieracium tetraodon Hieracium thaumasioides Hieracium thaumasium 
 Hieracium thracicum Hieracium thyraicum Hieracium tilingii Hieracium timanense Hieracium tjapomense Hieracium tjumentzevii Hieracium tolmatchevii Hieracium tolvaense Hieracium torticepsHieracium traillii Hieracium transnivense Hieracium transpeczoricum Hieracium transsilvanicum Hieracium triangulare Hieracium tricheilema Hieracium trichobrachium Hieracium trichocymosoides Hieracium trichocymosum Hieracium tridentaticeps Hieracium tridentatum Hieracium trigonophorum Hieracium triste Hieracium tritum Hieracium trivialiforme Hieracium truncipilum Hieracium tschkhubianischwilii Hieracium tuadaschense Hieracium tulomense Hieracium tunguskanum Hieracium turcomanicum Hieracium turkestanicum Hieracium tuvinicum Hieracium tweriense Hieracium tzagwerianum Hieracium uczanssuense Hieracium ueksipii Hieracium ugandiense Hieracium umbellaticeps Hieracium umbellatum  : Narrowleaf hawkweed
 Hieracium umbrosum Hieracium uralense Hieracium uranopoleos Hieracium vagae Hieracium vagum Hieracium vaidae Hieracium vaillantii Hieracium valmierense Hieracium varangerense Hieracium varatinense 
 Hieracium varsugae Hieracium vasconicum Hieracium velutinum Hieracium venosum : Rattlesnakeweed
 Hieracium veresczaginii Hieracium verruculatum Hieracium vestipes Hieracium villosellipes Hieracium villosipes Hieracium villosum Hieracium violascentiforme Hieracium virentisquamum Hieracium virgultorum Hieracium virosum Hieracium vischerae Hieracium viscidulum Hieracium vitellicolor Hieracium volhynicum Hieracium vulgatum Hieracium vulpinum Hieracium vulsum Hieracium vvedenskyi Hieracium wimmeri Hieracium wolczankense Hieracium wolgense Hieracium wologdense Hieracium worochtae Hieracium wrightii Hieracium wysokae Hieracium × haematopodum
 Hieracium zelencense Hieracium zinserlingianum Hieracium zinserlingii Hieracium zizianumFurther speciesHieracium proximum F.J.HanburyHackney, P. Ed. 1992. Stewart & Corry's Flora of the North-east of Ireland. Third Edition. Institute of Irish Studies & The Queen's University of Belfast. Hieracium hesperium P.D.SellHieracium pangoriense ZahnHieracium sprucei'' Arv.-Touv.

References

External links
International Organization for Plant Information - List of Hieracium

List
Hieracium